Jang Yong-jun (Hangul: 장용준, born May 30, 2000), better known by his stage name NO:EL (Hangul: 노엘), is a South Korean rapper. He released his first album, Elleonoel, on September 2, 2017.

He is also a son of Chang Je-won, an incumbent Member of the National Assembly from the United Future Party.

On September 7, 2019, he drove under the influence of alcohol. He later received a suspended sentence for drunk driving and attempting to cover it up.

On September 25, 2020, NO:EL ended his contract with Indigo Music.

On April 29, 2021, NO:EL came back and released his album 21'S/S.

Discography

Studio albums

Extended plays

Charted singles

References

2000 births
Living people
South Korean male rappers
South Korean hip hop singers
21st-century South Korean male  singers